The Tour of Eritrea is a multistage bicycle race held annually throughout Eritrea.

History
The first race was staged in 1946. It was promoted by the Italian community of Eritrea with the Italian name Primo Giro dell'Eritrea. Its inaugural Tour of Eritrea had 34 participants and was won by Nunzio Barrilà of the team A.C. Piemonte. It had five stages, with a very difficult Premio della Montagna (Stage of the Mountain).

In 1947, the second Giro dell'Eritrea was not allowed because of political reasons related to a growing guerrilla war in British occupied Eritrea. However, a smaller Giro/Tour was held in its place called the Giro delle 3 Valli ("Tour of the 3 Valleys"). It was won by Esmiles Zoli.

In 2001, after a fifty-year-long hiatus, the Tour was resurrected as celebration of the tenth anniversary of the Eritrean independence. It was won by Habte Weldesimon, who repeated his victory in 2003 and 2004.

Merhawi Ghebrehiwot won both the 2007 and 2008 Tours.
In 2009 the tour of Eritrea was recongnaized by the UCI for the first time .It was given a 2.2 HC and included 5 stage. The winner was Meron Russom and Bereket Yemane got the jersey awarded for the best climber  As of 2014, the latest tour was held in 2013 and was won by Mekseb Abrha Debesay.

2008 results
Podium of the 2008 edition:
Merhawi Ghebrehiwot (team EriTel) with 47.00 points
Dawit Haile (team Asbeco) with 40.00 points
Frekalsi Debesay with 37.00 points

The last stage (in Asmara, done April 20) was won by Domenico Vaccaro, an Italian Eritrean, of the team Medeber.

Route
The Tour's route has changed since the colonial period. It  consists today of a  race contended in 5 stages. The race covers various geographic regions, including the desert lowlands, the chilly highlands and windy coast.

The race usually start off at the beaches of Massawa, up the winding mountain highway with its precipitous valleys and cliffs to the capital Asmara. From there, it continued downwards onto the western plains of the Gash-Barka Region, only to return to Asmara from the south.

This is, by far, the most popular sport in modern Eritrea, followed by many thousands of fans and with nearly 100 professional Eritrean cyclists.  Indeed, the Tour of Eritrea is followed enthusiastically by the Eritrean population around the roads, like happens in the Tour de France of France and the Giro d'Italia of Italy.

Jersey
During the Tour, the previous stage's winner is awarded a blue jersey in recognition of their achievement. A red jersey is awarded to those who win the climbing contest while the yellow jersey is worn by the overall Tour leader.

Winners

References

See also

Cycle races in Eritrea
Eritrea
UCI Africa Tour races
1946 establishments in Eritrea